Achave  is a village in the southern state of Karnataka, India. It is located in the Ankola taluk of Uttara Kannada district in Karnataka.

This village is known for large number of mango, kokum, coconut and arecanut plantation and many micro enterprises.
Inhabited communities are Nadavaru,  Brahmin, Halakki Vokkaliga, Marathi, Namdhari Naik, Komarpant, Siddhi, Patagar, scheduled castes and scheduled tribes.

Villages: Kuntakani , Angadibail, Mabage, Keshwalli, Motigudda etc.

Achave village has beautiful and attractive nature.
 
Vibuthi Water Falls and Yana Rocks are the  not be missed when in Achave.

Achave village is developing village in Ankola.

See also
 Hillur 
 Uttara Kannada
 Districts of Karnataka
 Mangalore

References

External links
 

Villages in Uttara Kannada district